The Osaka Bioscience Institute was an institute in Osaka, Japan between 1987 and 2015, devoted to the study of bioscience. Scientists from it discovered the retinal protein pikachurin.

External links

Japanese Ministry of Education, Sports, Science, and Technology page about the Osaka Bioscience Institute

Education in Osaka